is  the  head coach of the Sendai 89ers in the Japanese B.League.

Head coaching record

|-
| style="text-align:left;"|Gunma Crane Thunders
| style="text-align:left;"|2013-14
| 32||10||22|||| style="text-align:center;"|10th in Eastern|||-||-||-||
| style="text-align:center;"|-

|-
| style="text-align:left;"|Fukushima Firebonds
| style="text-align:left;"|2014-15
| 52||21||31|||| style="text-align:center;"|7th in Eastern|||2||0||2||
| style="text-align:center;"|Lost in 1st round
|-
| style="text-align:left;"|Fukushima Firebonds
| style="text-align:left;"|2015-16
| 52||30||22|||| style="text-align:center;"|6th in Eastern|||2||0||2||
| style="text-align:center;"|Lost in 1st round
|-
| style="text-align:left;"|San-en NeoPhoenix
| style="text-align:left;"|2016-17
| 60||33||27|||| style="text-align:center;"|2nd in Central|||2||0||2||
| style="text-align:center;"|Lost in 1st round
|-
| style="text-align:left;"|San-en NeoPhoenix
| style="text-align:left;"|2017-18
| 60||25||35|||| style="text-align:center;"|4th in Central|||-||-||-||
| style="text-align:center;"|-
|-
| style="text-align:left;"|San-en NeoPhoenix
| style="text-align:left;"|2018-19
| 60||22||38|||| style="text-align:center;"|5th in Central|||-||-||-||
| style="text-align:center;"|-
|-
| style="text-align:left;"|Ryukyu Golden Kings
| style="text-align:left;"|2019-20
| 21||14||7|||| style="text-align:center;"|1st in Western|||-||-||-||
| style="text-align:center;"|-
|-

References

1986 births
Living people
Fukushima Firebonds coaches
Gunma Crane Thunders coaches
Japanese basketball coaches
Miyazaki Shining Suns players
Ryukyu Golden Kings coaches
San-en NeoPhoenix coaches
San-en NeoPhoenix players